Custom House or Customs House may refer to:

Buildings
 Custom house, a building housing the offices that process the tariffs associated with importing and exporting goods

Australia
 Customs House, Brisbane, Queensland
 Customs House, Maryborough, Queensland
 Customs House, Rockhampton, Queensland
 Customs House, Sydney, New South Wales
 Fremantle Customs House, Western Australia
 Newcastle Customs House, New South Wales

Canada
 Custom House, Montreal, Canada

China
 Customs House, Shanghai

Ireland
 The Custom House, Cork
 The Old Custom House, Dublin
 The Custom House, Dublin
 Custom House, Belfast
 The Custom House, Limerick

Myanmar (Burma)
 Customs House, Yangon

Norway
 Customs House, Porsgrunn
Tollerodden, Larvik

Thailand
 Customs House, Bangkok

United Kingdom
 Custom House, Barrow-in-Furness, England
 Custom House, Belfast, Northern Ireland
 Custom House, Exeter, England
 Custom House, Lancaster, England
 Custom House, Liverpool, England
 Custom House, City of London
 Customs House, Newcastle upon Tyne, England
 Custom House, Poole, England
 Customs House, South Shields, Tyneside, England
 Custom House, Weymouth, England

United States
 Old Custom House (Monterey, California)
 Boston Custom House, Boston, Massachusetts
 Alexander Hamilton U.S. Custom House, Manhattan, New York
 Custom House (Sag Harbor, New York)
 Customs House (Sodus Point, New York)
 United States Custom House (New York City)
 United States Customhouse (Portland, Oregon)
 Customs House (Nashville, Tennessee)

Other uses
 Custom House (global payments), a global payments and foreign exchange company
 Custom House, Newham, a district of the London Borough of Newham, UK
 Custom House for ExCeL DLR station
 Custom House Stadium, a name for West Ham Stadium
 "The Custom-House", Nathaniel Hawthorne's introductory essay to The Scarlet Letter
 Custom House, an imprint of William Morrow and Company

See also
 Customs broking
 Old Customhouse (disambiguation)